The elm Ulmus wallichiana subsp. xanthoderma was identified by Melville and Heybroek 
after the latter's expedition to the Himalaya in 1960.
The tree is of more western distribution than subsp. wallichiana, ranging from Afghanistan to Kashmir.

Description
A deciduous tree growing to 30 m with a crown comprising several ascending branches. The bark of the trunk is pale grey, coarsely furrowed longitudinally. The branchlets become orange- or yellow-brown, glandular at first, not hairy. The leaves range from 5.6–14 cm long by 3–7.5 cm broad, elliptic-acuminate in shape, and with a glabrous upper surface, on petioles 7–10 mm long. The inflorescence is slightly glandular, almost glabrous. The samarae are orbicular to obovate, with a few glandular hairs; the seed central.

Pests and diseases
The tree has a high resistance to the fungus Ophiostoma himal-ulmi endemic to the Himalaya and the cause of Dutch elm disease there.

Cultivation
There are a few trees planted in England and The Netherlands. It is not known in North America or Australasia.

Accessions

Europe

 Grange Farm Arboretum, Lincolnshire, UK. Acc. no. 643 (Heybroek's clone P296).

 Wijdemeren City Council Elm Arboretum, 1 tree planted Brilhoek, Nederhorst den Berg 2019,  tree number: 112793

References

External links

 

  U. wallichiana subsp. xanthoderma, leaves specimen (Melville & Heybroek); Baba Reshi, Gulmarg, Kashmir, India (1960)

wallichiana subsp. xanthoderma
Trees of Afghanistan
Trees of the Indian subcontinent
Plant subspecies
Ulmus articles missing images
Elm species and varieties